Minona Frieb-Blumauer  (11 May 1816 – 31 July 1886) was a German actress and singer.

Life 
Born in Stuttgart, Minona (actually Johanna) Frieb-Blumauer was the daughter of the actor Karl Blumauer, with whom she received her first lessons. Already as a child, she appeared in Neustrelitz in der Freischütz and 1828 in Gotha as a boy in the Magic Flute. She studied singing for three years at the Prague Conservatory and was immediately engaged for a guest performance in Darmstadt. She stayed there for three years and then moved to Cologne and Aachen, where she performed successfully under , especially in Gioachino Rossini's operas, for example as Rosine in The Barber of Seville.

As her voice was not up to the demands in the long run, she switched to spoken theatre. Karl Immermann brought her to Düsseldorf and under his guidance she developed into an outstanding actress. After she had worked as a youthful and lively lover in Meiningen and finally in Brno, she married the engineer Emanuel Frieb (their daughter Lina became an opera singer) in 1839. After a break, she only appeared again in 1841 at the Wiedener and Carltheater in Vienna, where Moritz Gottlieb Saphir had recommended her.

During a guest performance in Vienna Theodor Döring saw the actress in several older and comical roles. After his return, he arranged for Frieb-Blumauer to be invited to a rehearsal guest performance in Berlin, which she performed with great success. In 1854, she got a ten-year and later a lifelong contract with the royal playhouse. Among her pupils were Anita Augspurg, Olga Arendt, Agnes Freund and Anna Haverland.

Gustav Heinrich Gans zu Putlitz characterised the actress as follows: 

Similarly describes Gotthilf Weisstein the character and effect of the actress.: 

Shortly after a stay at a health resort in Wiesbaden, from which she had returned apparently recovered, Frieb-Blumauer died unexpectedly on 31 July 1886 at the age of 70 in Berlin. The eulogy at the grave was delivered by Arthur Deetz, director of the Königliches Schauspielhaus. The preserved grave site is marked by a plate with inscription and ornaments.

Students 
 Anita Augspurg, Olga Arendt, Agnes Freund, Anna Haverland, Catharine Jacobi, Laura Friedmann, Hedwig Meyer, Amanda Tscherpa

Further reading 
 Ludwig Eisenberg: Großes biographisches Lexikon der Deutschen Bühne im XIX. Jahrhundert. List, Leipzig 1903,  (Numerized)
 
 
 Deutsches Theater-Lexikon. Vol. 1: A – Hurk. Kleinmayr, Klagenfurt 1953, pp. 494 f.

References

External links 

 

German stage actresses
1816 births
1886 deaths
Actresses from Stuttgart
19th-century German singers
Musicians from Stuttgart